Mavrovi Anovi is a village in the Mavrovo and Rostuša Municipality of North Macedonia. Its FIPS code was MK64.

Demographics
According to the 2002 census, the village had a total of 167 inhabitants. Ethnic groups in the village include:

Macedonians 137
Turks 16
Serbs 2
Romani 10
Others 2

References 

Villages in Mavrovo and Rostuša Municipality